Farmeria is a genus of flowering plants in the riverweed family Podostemaceae, native to Sri Lanka and India. They attach to rocks using holdfasts, and their flowers are protected by boat-shaped spathella until they emerge.

Species
Currently accepted species include:

Farmeria indica Willis
Farmeria metzgerioides (Trimen) Willis ex Hook.f.

References

Podostemaceae
Malpighiales genera